Kudroli  is a locality in the city of Mangalore, Karnataka, India. Kudroli is just 2 km from the heart of the city.

History 
Kudroli was earlier Known as Kudre-halli where Tippu Sultan, the ruler of Mysore, army used to have Horses stables and grazing land, is one of the oldest and well-known localities of Mangalore City located on the Western Coastal belt of Karnataka, India . Since it is the oldest locality pre-dominated by Muslim inhabitants it has become an Islamic learning center of the city which also hosts various religious functions and the festivities. It is also a historic place as the ruler,  Tippu Sultan has his fort just a couple of kilometers away known as Sultan Battery. Kudroli is also famous for Gokarnatheshwara Temple. This temple was built by a great devotee (of lord Shiva) and businessman called H. Coragappa in the year 1912. Coragappa who belonged to the Billava (traditionally a warrior caste) family built the temple at a place which was believed to be the graze land for the horses during the rule of Tipu Sultan. Hence the name Kudre (horse) halli which transformed into kudroli over time. we still find some prominent Mosque Built during Tippu Sultan Time, one is Shamil Vali Mosque, Near Chitra Cinema. Ustad Shamil Vali was a great Scholar, when he died, few soldiers were placed to guard his Burial hence a Small Mosque came up, was Built near the site, which was later Known as Shamil Masjid. One more Mosque rebuilt during his time was in Bunder. we find Beautiful beaches around, frequented by local. Mangalore city is the city of Church, well said, here we find Peoples from all community very friendly and Peace Loving.

See also 
 Gokarnanatheshwara Temple
 Mangalore Dasara

References 

Localities in Mangalore